Barnesiella is a genus of bacteria from the family Barnesiellaceae.

References

Further reading 
 
 

Bacteroidia
Bacteria genera